Pomboa is a genus of Colombian cellar spiders that was first described by B. A. Huber in 2000, and named in honour of Colombian poet Rafael Pombo.

Species
 it contains four species, found only in Colombia:
Pomboa cali Huber, 2000 – Colombia
Pomboa pallida Huber, 2000 – Colombia
Pomboa quimbaya Valdez-Mondragón, 2012 – Colombia
Pomboa quindio Huber, 2000 (type) – Colombia

See also
 List of Pholcidae species
 List of organisms named after famous people (born 1800–1899)

References

Araneomorphae genera
Pholcidae
Spiders of South America